The Turlock Journal is a newspaper in Turlock, California. It is owned by 209 Multimedia. The Journal was a daily newspaper until 2004, when it was reduced to twice-weekly publication. It has a paid circulation of approximately 4,000. The managing editor is Kristina Hacker. Hank Vander Veen is the publisher.

The first edition of the Turlock Journal hit the streets in 1904 as a weekly, when Turlock had just a few hundred people. Founders Harry and Jack Randolph owned the Journal until just after World War I, when the newspaper was sold to printer Edwin Earl Ullberg, who immediately changed the newspaper to a daily.

The Farmers’ Press Association, a cooperative, took over the Journal in 1920 and changed the name to the Farmers’ Daily Journal.  Josie Goodwin, a secretary in the cooperative, acquired a controlling interest in the paper and stayed on as publisher for 13 years. During her tenure, the Journal changed to afternoon delivery.

The paper was sold again in 1933 to brothers W. Cliff McDowell and Jack S. McDowell, former owners of the Alameda Times-Star. The brothers switched circulation patterns once again, delivering in the morning to rural residents and in the afternoon for city subscribers.

The paper was sold seven years later to  nationally known sports writer Edward  Frayne, and his wife, Vera, of New York City. Under the Fraynes’ ownership, the Journal moved from South First Street to its current home on South Center and Crane. After a heart attack forced Edward Frayne into inactivity, the couple sold the paper to  Lowell Jessen of Holtville, just two months before Pearl Harbor.

World War II saw the death of the morning edition of the Journal, due to paper rationing. In 1953, Jessen left Turlock to take over the Beverly Hills Citizen, purchased from Will Rogers Jr.  He sold a 49 percent interest to Stanley T. Wilson, publisher of the Mill Valley Record, who then became editor and publisher of the Journal. Wilson later acquired a full 50 percent interest. Jessen returned in 1963 at his partner’s request and they shared the publishing responsibilities for the next two years, until the Journal was sold to Freedom Communications.
Jessen remained publisher until 1971.  Publisher Jim Lyons took over operations through 1993.

The Journal was sold again in 1996 to Central Valley Publishing (later renamed Pacific-Sierra), beginning a series of ownership changes and budget cuts that accompanied a decline in circulation. In 2003, Pacific-Sierra head Anthony Allegretti lead a buyout to form a new company, MainStreet Media Group. Ultimately, after a sale to Morris Multimedia in 2004, the Journal switched to twice-weekly publication and refocused its coverage on community news.

In 2020, the Journal was sold to 209 Multimedia, owned by publisher Hank Vander Veen.

209 Multimedia also publishes 209 Magazine, a regional magazine, from Turlock.

Miscellany
Leonard Wibberley, author of "The Mouse that Roared," worked briefly as a Turlock Journal reporter.

In September 2004, the Turlock Journal was the first newspaper to begin publishing a full page of Keenspot, Web-based comic strips. The project ended two years later.

Paul Stine, a victim of the Zodiac Killer, worked briefly as a Turlock Journal reporter in 1957 after graduating High School.

Dave Meltzer, journalist and sports historian, best known as the publisher and editor of the Wrestling Observer Newsletter, worked briefly at the Turlock Journal as a sports writer.

References

External links

Morris Multimedia
Newspapers published in California